This is a list of all attacks on Israeli embassies and diplomats that have occurred since the establishment of the State of Israel in 1948.

List

References 

Israeli embassies and diplomats
attacks against Israeli embassies and diplomats
attacks against Israeli embassies and diplomats
 Attacks against
 List of attacks against
 Attacks on diplomatic mission of Israel